Lärjeån is a Swedish river that flows from Stora Lövsjön, east of Gothenburg, to the Göta älv in the northern Lärjedalen valley.

References

Rivers of Västra Götaland County